Arlette Soudan-Nonault is a Congolese journalist and politician. She serves as Republic of Congo's Minister of Tourism and Environment.

Early life and career
Soudan-Nonault was born in Brazzaville to Senator Jean-Pierre Nonault, who served as Congolese ambassador to France and Russia. She received her education in these countries. She then trained as a journalist. She was a presenter of news programs on Radio Congo as well as produced a number of shows such as Les stratèges du Look and Clin d'oeil d'Arlette Soudan- Nonault. She then served as the press attache to the President of Republic of Congo between 1992 and 1997.

She then launched a communication consulting firm. In 2005, she founded a private school Institution Saint François d'Assise in the outskirts of Brazzaville.

On April 30, 2016, Soudan-Nonault was named the Minister of Tourism and Recreation in the Congolese government led by Prime Minister Clément Mouamba.  In this role, she is charged with increasing the share of tourism from 3% to 10% by 2021, to help diversify the country's economy away from declining oil revenues. Investments will be made to improve the country's attractiveness to high-end eco-tourists. In August 2017, she took on additional charge of the Ministry of Environment replacing Rosalie Matondo.

Soudan-Nonault is married to journalist François Soudan, who is the director of magazine Jeune Afrique.

References

Living people
People from Brazzaville
Republic of the Congo politicians
Year of birth missing (living people)
Environment ministers of the Republic of the Congo
Tourism ministers of the Republic of the Congo